That Was Only Yesterday – The Last EP was the last recording of David Byron less than a year before his death. In late 1983 Richard Manners (Blue Mountain Music) asked Richard "Digby" Smith (Rough Diamond, Free, Sammy Hagar, Mott the Hoople) to put together a band and cut some tracks with David. Including drummer Neil Conteh (Jagger/Bowie), bassist Alan Spenner (Joe Cocker, Roxy Music), guitarist Tim Renwick (Elton John, Eric Clapton, Pink Floyd), keyboardist John "Rabbit" Bundrick (Free, Roger Waters, The Who), along with the Chanter Sisters doing backing vocals a group of musicians were assembled. In February 1984 at Power Plant Studios, London three tracks were recorded.

Track listing
"That Was Only Yesterday" (Gary Wright)
"Waiting for the Sun" (Jim Morrison)
"Pride and Joy" (Marvin Gaye, Norman Whitfield, William "Mickey" Stevenson)

Personnel
David Byron - Lead Vocals
Tim Renwick - Lead Guitars
Alan Spenner - Bass
John Bundrick - Keyboards
Neil Conteh - Drums
Chanter Sisters - Backing Vocals

2008 EPs
David Byron albums